Kaniyu Onsen is a hot spring in Kaniyu, Nikkō, Japan. It is part of the Oku Kinu hot springs group.

References 

Hot springs of Japan
Landforms of Tochigi Prefecture
Tourist attractions in Tochigi Prefecture